Muslim .357 (or Magnum Muslim .357) is a 1986 Philippine action film directed by and starring Fernando Poe Jr. as an undercover officer of the Philippine Constabulary. The film was both a box-office and critical success, earning nominations from various award giving bodies in the Philippines, twice winning the Best Actor award for Poe's performance. This, along with Poe's earlier portrayal of a Muslim hero in Zamboanga (1966), endeared Poe even more to Muslim audiences who are known to be passionate about the outcome of Poe's movies story-wise.

Synopsis
When his superior sends him to Manila to unmask a powerful syndicate, 1st Lt. Jamal Razul (Fernando Poe Jr.), an undercover cop, takes a job posing as the bodyguard of an influential police major. But when the syndicate's cronies uncover his motives, Jamal finds himself running for his life. Meanwhile, his Muslim faith has him doing everything in his power to avenge the deaths of two innocent teens who helped him conceal his true identity.

Plot
1st Lt. Jamal Razul (Fernando Poe Jr.) is a Muslim undercover Philippine Constabulary officer, who is sent to Manila to help curb the runaway crime rate. Convinced of his abilities as an undercover agent, he is summoned by Lt. Col. Castro to assist in unmasking the head of a big and vicious syndicate.

In Manila, he is able to track down the warehouse where the syndicate drops off their illicit goods, but a firefight ensues. Razul survives and his anonymity still maintained, but is left wounded. Fortunately for Razul, two young boys (Christopher Paloma and Michael Roberts) found him and, along with their grandfather (Max Alvarado) and Razul's landlady (Vivian Foz), nurse him back to health.

After ascertaining the identity of one of the syndicate's high-ranking official, Frankie (Paquito Diaz), he applies for work as a hired hand in the syndicate. However, before Razul could begin work, he was exposed as an undercover agent and the roles are suddenly reversed - Razul now becoming the hunted instead of the hunter. Lt. Col. Castro advices him to return to Mindanao, but the syndicate would rather have him dead as he has already caused considerable damage to be let go scot free. Failing to silence him, they turned their ire on the two kids that helped him. They kill the two boys.

The killing strikes a sensitive chord in Razul, the Muslim in him surfaces and vows revenge on all the remaining members of the gang. He picks apart the members of the gang one by one until all that is left is Frankie. With the barrel of the eponymous Magnum .357 pointed at him, Frankie reveals the stronghold of the syndicate in  Santa Cruz, Manila. While surveiling the area, Razul discovers that the syndicate's protector is a senior official in the Philippine Constabulary, Capt. Rios (Eddie Garcia), who has up to that point assumed the leadership of the syndicate after eliminating the syndicate's former head (Jimmy Fabregas). Another firefight ensues which ends in a showdown between Razul and Rios, with the former emerging the survivor. Razul, having finished his mission and avenging the boys that have become unwitting victims in his mission, thanks Allah.

Cast

Fernando Poe Jr. as 1st Lt. Jamal Razul
Eddie Garcia as Capt. Rios
Vivian Foz as Dess
Paquito Diaz as Frankie
Eddie Arenas as Sgt. Alex Suarez
Max Alvarado as Imo
Romy Diaz
Vic Diaz
Ruel Vernal as Bert
Jimmy Fabregas as Jimmy
Augusto Victa
Ernie Zarate
Nick Lizaso
Vic Varrion
Rey Tomenes
Renato del Prado
Fernando Fernandez
Col. Juan Medalla (Ret.)
Lt. Col. Luis T. Castro as himself
Rey Langit as Sgt. Bulusan
Christopher Paloma as Kikoy
Michael Roberts as Buknoy
Elvie Escaro
Vickay Torres
Rene Hawkins as Carding
Nonoy De Guzman
Belo Borja
Jess Vargas
Edward Torres
Eddie Tuazon as Edwin
Mel Arca

Jimmy Reyes
Ernie David
Bert Garon
Joe Estrada
Buddy Dator
Eddie Samonte
Rey Valenzuela
Boy Sta. Maria
Renato Tanchingco
Efren Belardo
Telly Babasa
Emy Gutierrez
Eric Navarro
Mario Cavero
Pilo Puruganan
Lito Francisco
Boy Mediavillo
Bebot Davao
Jun Montano
Omay Rivera
George Wendth
Thunder Stuntmen

Remake

The film was remade in 2014 under the title Muslim Magnum .357: To Serve and Protect with E.R. Ejercito in the title role and Francis "Jun" Posadas as the director. The remake was an official entry into the 2014 Metro Manila Film Festival and was dedicated to the memory of Fernando Poe Jr. which coincides with Poe's 10th death anniversary.

Accolades

References

External links

1986 films
Films set in Manila
Philippine action films
Films directed by Fernando Poe Jr.